The Independent Socialist Party was a political party in Hungary. It was founded in 1897 by István Várkonyi. Várkonyi had been expelled from the Hungarian Social Democratic Party for being outspoken on agrarian issues. Várkonyi's party advocated land reforms, including forced sale of large estates. It took part in mobilizing radical peasant struggles.

References

Political parties in Austria-Hungary
Political parties established in 1897
Socialist parties in Hungary
1897 establishments in Hungary